Elmira Süleymanova (born 17 July 1937), is an Azerbaijani chemist and civil servant. In 2002 she became the Commissioner for Human Rights (Ombudsman) of the Republic.

Biography
Süleymanova was born in Baku on 17 July 1937 and graduated in Chemistry from the State University of Azerbaijan and graduated with honors. Since then she worked in the Institute of Petrochemical Processes of Azerbaijan National Academy of Sciences as a laboratory assistant and later became the Head of the laboratory. In 1967 she got a postgraduate from the National  Academy of Sciences, in 1980 a doctorate and has been a university professor since 1988. She is also member of the New York Academy of Sciences since 1997. Is the author 200 scientific works and collaborated in near 40 inventions for Chemistry and Perfumuery industries.

She is expert in Petrochemicals and Organic Chemistry. She is the founder and honorary president of Azerbaijan Women and Development Center, a NGO that have the consultative status with the UN Economic and Social Council.

Career as Ombudsman 
The National Assembly elected Süleymanova as the first Ombudsman on 2 July 2002, and was re-elected in 2010. 

In 2004, regarding the 30-year prison sentence of Ramil Safarov, she stated that Safarov's punishment was too harsh and that "Safarov must become an example of patriotism for the Azerbaijani youth".

In 2015 she was named vice-president of the Asian Ombudsman Association and is also member of the European Ombudsman Institute. As Ombudsman, she has implemented programs that protect and improve the status of women and the elderly, displaced youth, the poor, and victims of violence.

The President Ilham Aliyev awarded her the Order of Glory in 2007 and the Order of Honor in 2017 for her contribution on the defence of the human rights.

References

1937 births
Living people
Azerbaijani chemists
Azerbaijani women scientists
Baku State University alumni
Ombudspersons in Azerbaijan
Azerbaijani professors
21st-century Azerbaijani women politicians
21st-century Azerbaijani politicians
Recipients of the Shohrat Order
Recipients of the Sharaf Order
Scientists from Baku